Minchakovo is a rural locality (a village) in Nikolotorzhskoye Rural Settlement, Kirillovsky District, Vologda Oblast, Russia. The population was 23 as of 2002.

Geography 
Minchakovo is located 37 km northeast of Kirillov (the district's administrative centre) by road. Sazonovo is the nearest rural locality.

References 

Rural localities in Kirillovsky District